Leonie Mellinger (born 24 June 1959) is a British actress, author and communications skills coach.

Early life
Mellinger was born in the British military hospital neighbouring Spandau Prison as her actor father was then working for Bertolt Brecht's theatre company (the Berliner Ensemble). Her Jewish parents were childhood refugees from Nazi Germany; her grandfather was Werner Scholem, who was killed in Buchenwald.

Career
Mellinger trained at the Central School of Speech and Drama. Her acting debut was as Miriam in the 1981 BBC television serialisation of D.H. Lawrence's Sons and Lovers.  In the television serial Small World (1988), based on the novel by David Lodge, she played a central double role portraying the twins Angelica and Lily. Her stage appearances with the Royal Shakespeare Company have included Lavinia in Titus Andronicus and Perdita in The Winter's Tale.

As well as acting, she teaches communication and personal impact skills at her own training company.

Personal life
Mellinger married actor Robin Askwith in 1988, although they divorced in 1991. She then married Anthony Burton in 1996 and the couple had a daughter, Aurelie, born the same year.

Filmography

Film

Television

References

External links

Official website

Living people
English television actresses
English film actresses
Alumni of the Royal Central School of Speech and Drama
1959 births